Lin Junhong (born 9 December 1990) is a Chinese track cyclist. She represented her nation at the 2010, 2011, 2012, 2014 and 2015 UCI Track Cycling World Championships.

Major results

2014
Asian Track Championships
1st  Sprint
1st  Team Sprint (with Zhong Tianshi)
1st Keirin, Hong Kong International Track Cup
China Track Cup
1st Keirin
1st Sprint
3rd Sprint, Asian Games
3rd Keirin, Adelaide Cycling Grand Prix
3rd Sprint, Super Drome Cup
3rd Sprint, South Australian Track Classic
2015
Asian Track Championships
1st  Keirin
2nd Sprint
2nd Sprint, Singen
China Track Cup
2nd Keirin
3rd Keirin
3rd Sprint
3rd Sprint, Dudenhofen
2016
1st  Sprint, Asian Track Championships
2017
1st  500m Time Trial, National Track Championships

References

External links
 
 

1990 births
Chinese female cyclists
Cyclists from Heilongjiang
Living people
Asian Games medalists in cycling
Cyclists at the 2010 Asian Games
Cyclists at the 2014 Asian Games
Cyclists at the 2018 Asian Games
Medalists at the 2010 Asian Games
Medalists at the 2014 Asian Games
Medalists at the 2018 Asian Games
Asian Games gold medalists for China
Asian Games silver medalists for China
Asian Games bronze medalists for China
21st-century Chinese women